Carina Christensen (born 8 November 1972, in Fredericia) is a Danish politician representing the Conservative People's Party. She was the Minister of Family and Consumer Affairs in the Cabinet of Anders Fogh Rasmussen II from 15 December 2006 to 23 November 2007. She replaced Lars Barfoed after he had been criticized for poor official food quality inspections. Such inspections fall under the portfolio of the Family and Consumption Ministry.

Christensen was the Minister for Transportation from 23 November 2007 to 10 September 2008 and she has since been Culture Minister, both as a member of the Cabinet of Anders Fogh Rasmussen III.

Early life
Born in Fredericia. She graduated in business administration and languages from South Jutland University Centre.

References

 

1972 births
Living people
Members of the Folketing 2001–2005
Members of the Folketing 2005–2007
Members of the Folketing 2007–2011
Danish Culture Ministers
Ministers for children, young people and families
Conservative People's Party (Denmark) politicians
21st-century Danish women politicians
Women members of the Folketing
Women government ministers of Denmark
People from Fredericia
Transport ministers of Denmark